England Netball, formerly the "All England Netball Association", is the national body which oversees, promotes and manages netball in England.

Overview
England Netball is responsible for the management of the England national netball team, nicknamed The Vitality Roses. It also oversees a number of programs running from junior to development level such as High Five Netball, Walking Netball, Bee Netball and the Roses National Academy for aspiring athletes under the age of 20.

As of June 2017, England Netball has 103,335 affiliated members and more than 180,000 women and girls play the sport every week.

Hall of Fame
England Netball launched the concept of the Hall of Fame in 2001, in the year of the 75th Anniversary of the All England Netball Association. The inductees are listed below by year inducted.

2001
 Mary Beardwood
 Mary Bulloch
 Annette Cairncross
 Mary French (née Bushell)
 Rose Harris, MBE
 Joyce Haynes
 Jean Perkins OBE
 Sheelagh Redpath
 Kendra Slawinski
 Rena Stratford
 Pat Taylor MBE
 Mary Thomas MBE

2002
 Jean Bourne
 Margaret Cassidy OBE 
 Frances Tomkins 
 
2003
 Betty Galsworthy
 Joyce Wheeler
 
2004
 Heather Crouch MBE
 
2005
 Pam Orton 
 Gordon Padley MBE
 Anne Stephenson

2007
 Colette Thomson
 
2008
 Janet Wrighton MBE
 Amanda Newton
 
2009
 Karen Atkinson MBE

2010
 Liz Broomhead MBE

2012
 Anna Mayes

2013
 Sonia Mkoloma
 Sheila Perks MBE

2014
 Jade Clarke
 Cheryl Danson
 Joan Mills

2015
 Pamela Cookey
 Geva Mentor CBE

2016
 Gary Burgess

References

External links
 Official website 
 BBC Netball
 Sky Sports Netball
 Our Netball History – Archival website dedicated to English netball

Loughborough Sport
Netball in England
England
Organisations based in Hertfordshire
Organisations based in Leicestershire
Sports organizations established in 1926
Sport in Hertfordshire
Netball
1926 establishments in England
Eng